Breaking the Heart of the World: Woodrow Wilson and the Fight for the League of Nations is a 2001 book by the historian John M. Cooper about Woodrow Wilson and his advocacy for the League of Nations. It was published by Cambridge University Press.

References

2003 non-fiction books
Cambridge University Press books
Books about Woodrow Wilson